The Distinguished Gentleman is a 1992 American political comedy film starring Eddie Murphy. The film was directed by Jonathan Lynn. In addition to Murphy, the film stars Lane Smith, Sheryl Lee Ralph, Joe Don Baker, James Garner, Victoria Rowell, Grant Shaud, Kevin McCarthy, Charles S. Dutton, Victor Rivers, Chi McBride, Sonny Jim Gaines, and Noble Willingham.

The film's plot is centered on politics, specifically what members of Congress and lobbyists do to get what they want in Washington, D.C. This is the first film of Eddie Murphy not to be distributed by Paramount Pictures.

Plot
A Florida con man named Thomas Jefferson Johnson schemes to use the passing of the longtime Congressman from his district, Jefferson Davis "Jeff" Johnson (who died of a heart attack while having sex with his secretary), to get elected to the United States Congress as a freshman Congressman, where the money flows from lobbyists. Omitting his first name, and abbreviating his middle name, he calls himself "Jeff" Johnson.  He then manages to get on the ballot by pitching a seniors organization, the Silver Foxes, to endorse him.

Once on the election ballot, he uses the dead Congressman's old campaign material and runs a low budget campaign that appeals to name recognition, figuring most people do not pay much attention and simply vote for the "name you know."  He wins a slim victory and is off to Washington, a place where the "streets are lined with gold."

Initially, the lucrative donations and campaign contributions roll in, but as he learns the nature of the con game in Washington D.C., he starts to see how the greed and corruption makes it difficult to address issues such as campaign finance reform, environmental protection, and the possibility that electromagnetic fields from overhead power lines may be giving kids in a small town cancer, which the electric power company is concealing.

In trying to address these issues, Congressman Johnson finds himself double-crossed by the powerful chairman of the Committee on Power and Industry, Rep. Dick Dodge. Johnson decides to fight back the only way he knows how: with a con. Johnson succeeds and exposes Dodge as corrupt. As the film ends, it appears likely that Johnson will be thrown out of Congress on account of his previously unknown criminal record, but he defiantly declares, "I'm gonna run for President!" then breaking the fourth wall.

Cast
Eddie Murphy as Thomas Jefferson Johnson
Lane Smith as Dick Dodge
Sheryl Lee Ralph as Loretta Hicks
Joe Don Baker as Olaf Andersen
James Garner as Jeff Johnson
Victoria Rowell as Celia Kirby
Grant Shaud as Arthur Reinhardt
Kevin McCarthy as Terry Corrigan
Charles S. Dutton as Elijah Hawkins
Victor Rivers as Armando
Chi McBride as Homer
Sonny Jim Gaines as Van Dyke
Noble Willingham as Zeke Bridges
Cynthia Harris as Vera Johnson
Daniel Benzali as 'Skeeter' Warburton
Gary Frank as 'Iowa'
Frances Foster as Grandma Johnson
Doris Grau as Hattie Rifkin
Sarah Carson as Kimberly

Production
Eddie Murphy appeared in this Disney-produced film after a string of Paramount Pictures star vehicles. Bernie Weinraub, film reviewer for The New York Times, offered his opinion that Murphy wished to "move beyond the tepid material" he had been given by Paramount. Writer and producer Marty Kaplan said of Murphy's involvement "I feel like I've come close to winning the jackpot".

The film was shot at various locations in Washington, D.C.; Los Angeles; Harrisburg, Pennsylvania; Maryland, and Pasadena, California.

Later director Jonathan Lynn said: "It was the unlikely combination of Eddie Murphy and politics that drew me to it. The script was by a Washington insider, Marty Kaplan, who had been Vice President Mondale's speech writer. I loved working with Eddie, whom I had admired since 48 Hours and Trading Places. He was a superbly inventive comedy actor, and a delight to work with."

Reception

Box office
The Distinguished Gentleman was released in December 1992 and went on to gross approximately $47 million in the United States and Canada. Internationally, the film grossed $39 million for a worldwide total of $86 million.

Critical response
Critical reaction to the movie however was mostly negative. Roger Ebert of the Chicago Sun-Times liked the premise and what it had going for it, but criticized it for its "slow pacing", despite it being a screwball comedy.  Owen Gleiberman of Entertainment Weekly called it "a sterile, joyless comedy, photographed in ugly, made-for-video close-up and featuring a farce plot so laborious it suggests John Landis on a bad day". On review aggregation website Rotten Tomatoes, the film holds an approval rating of 13%, based on 16 reviews, and an average rating of 4.03/10.

The movie won the feature film Environmental Media Award in 1993, and in 2001 the Political Film Society gave the film its special award of the year.

Legacy
In 2023, Susan Estrich, ex-wife of the film's writer Marty Kaplan, argued in a column that life imitated art and drew parallels between the film's plot and the election of George Santos to Congress.

References

External links 
 
 
 
 

1992 comedy films
1992 films
American political comedy films
American political satire films
1990s English-language films
Films about identity theft
Films about elections
Films about corruption in the United States
Films about cancer in the United States
Films directed by Jonathan Lynn
Films scored by Randy Edelman
Films set in Washington, D.C.
Films shot in Baltimore
Films shot in Harrisburg, Pennsylvania
Films shot in Washington, D.C.
Fiction about government
Hollywood Pictures films
1990s American films